Kajana (also spelled Cajana and Kayana) is a village in Sipaliwini District, Suriname. It lies on the Gaan-lio (Gran Rio), which together with the Pikin Lio (Little Rio) forms the Suriname River. The population call themselves Kadosi-nengre after Cardoso who was the owner of the plantation they ran away from. The village is home to Maroons of the Saramaka tribe.

The town has a population of about 200 people. The town has a first-aid medical center, a radio station called Radio Thijs, a primary school, and a locally owned kindergarten. Kajana is served by Cayana Airstrip.

Healthcare 
Kajana is home to a Medische Zending healthcare centre.

See also
Kajana Sign Language

References

External links

Populated places in Sipaliwini District
Saramaka settlements